= Lonjah and the Ogre =

1993 novel by Zohour Wanese

- Original cover page in Arabic
- Author: Zohour Wanese
- Language: Arabic
- Published: 1993
- Publication place: Algeria

Lonjah and the Ogre (Arabic: لونجة والغول) is a novel by Algerian writer Zohour Wanese. It is ranked as one of the 100 best Arabic novels of the 20th century chosen by the Book Union. The novel recalls the values of struggle and the supremacy of Islamic values, and also presents historical, political and social issues, by narrating the events of life and the Algerian Revolution. It dealt with Algerian folklore as well.

== Summary ==
The novel shows the situation of Algeria before and during the war, and it focuses on a poor family, through which the novel shows the poverty, deprivation, and sadness that most people were suffering from, in order to make Algeria the "second home of the French", people were deprived from their freedom and resources. Zhour was able to make the main character of the novel a symbol of Algeria. “Malekah” the hero of the story, who lived under difficult conditions, and suffers from adversity and lack of independence, until the day came when they couldn't take their strige anymore. Algerian people decided to revolt, rejecting all kinds of harm and humiliation under which they lives, and thusly the Algerian people were given independence.
